Lawrence Lewis (June 22, 1879 – December 9, 1943) was an American lawyer, university professor, and politician from Colorado. He was elected to six terms in the United States House of Representatives, serving from 1933 until his death in 1943.

Early life and career
Born in St. Louis, Missouri, Lewis attended the public schools in Evanston, Illinois, Cambridge, Massachusetts, and Pueblo, Colorado. He attended the University of Colorado at Boulder and graduated from Harvard University in 1901.

Early in his career, he worked for newspapers and magazines in Pueblo and Denver, Colorado. He later served as assistant instructor in English at Harvard University from 1906 to 1909. He worked in this post while attending law school, graduating from the Harvard Law School in 1909. He was admitted to the bar the same year and commenced practice in Denver, Colorado.

Back in Denver, he served as member of the Colorado Civil Service Commission from 1917 to 1918.
He also served in the military as a private in the Seventeenth Observation Battery, Field Artillery, Central Officers' Training School in 1918.

Congress
He was an unsuccessful candidate for election in 1930 to the Seventy-second Congress. In 1932, he won election as a Democrat to the Seventy-third Congress. He was re-elected to the five succeeding Congresses, serving from March 4, 1933, until his death in 1943.

He was one of the managers appointed by the House of Representatives in 1933 to conduct the impeachment proceedings against Harold Louderback, judge of the United States District Court for the Northern District of California.

Death
He died in Washington, D.C., on December 9, 1943, and was interred in Spring Grove Cemetery, Cincinnati, Ohio.

See also
 List of United States Congress members who died in office (1900–49)

References

1879 births
1943 deaths
Burials at Spring Grove Cemetery
Harvard University faculty
United States Army soldiers
Democratic Party members of the United States House of Representatives from Colorado
University of Colorado Boulder alumni
Harvard Law School alumni
United States Army personnel of World War I
Harvard College alumni